St. Dunstan's Basilica is the Cathedral of the Diocese of Charlottetown in Charlottetown, Prince Edward Island, Canada. It is named for St. Dunstan the Anglo Saxon saint from Glastonbury. It is located on Great George Street, between the harbour and the Confederation Centre of the Arts.

History
The present stone structure was built in 1916, after a fire destroyed the original cathedral in 1913. 

In October 1980 it was the site of a state funeral when Prime Minister Pierre Elliot Trudeau gave the eulogy during the funeral for Veterans Affairs Minister Daniel J. MacDonald (M.P. Cardigan). The Basilica was designated as a National Historic Site of Canada in 1990.

References

Further reading
 Peter Ludlow, The Canny Scot: Archbishop James Morrison of Antigonish' (Montreal & Kingston: McGill-Queen's University Press, 2015)

External links
 
 

Roman Catholic churches in Prince Edward Island
Basilica churches in Canada
Churches in Charlottetown
Roman Catholic churches completed in 1916
Roman Catholic cathedrals in Canada
20th-century Roman Catholic church buildings in Canada